The G. C. Kuhlman Car Company was a leading American manufacturer of streetcars and interurbans in the early 20th century. The company was based in Cleveland, Ohio.

The Kuhlman Car Company was founded in 1892 by Gustav C. Kuhlman (c.1859-1915), his father and three other brothers.  It was acquired by the J. G. Brill Company in 1904, but continued building under the Kuhlman name.  It was reorganized in 1931 as J. G. Brill of Ohio, but ceased operations completely in 1932.  

Before it closed, as the market for electric streetcars and interurban cars began to contract, Brill gave Kuhlman the additional task of building steel diners.

The company's main clients were railways in Ohio, Michigan, New York, and Illinois, as well as streetcar operating companies in Akron, Detroit, Cleveland and Montreal, Quebec.

Products
 SE ST streetcar
 Peter Witt streetcar

Clients
 Boston Elevated Railway
 Chicago Aurora and Elgin Railroad
 Indiana Railroad
 Louisville Railway Company
 The Milwaukee Electric Railway and Light Company
 New York Railways
 Northern Ohio Traction and Light
 Montreal Street Railway Company
 Shaker Heights Rapid Transit

References

External links

 G. C. Kuhlman Car Company history. 2006. Mid-Continent Railway Museum website. 
 Preserved North American electric Kulhman equipment. Branford Electric Railway Association website.

Defunct rolling stock manufacturers of the United States
Manufacturing companies based in Cleveland
Vehicle manufacturing companies established in 1892
Electric vehicle manufacturers of the United States
Defunct manufacturing companies based in Ohio
Tram manufacturers
J. G. Brill Company